Bear Dance is a census-designated place (CDP) in Lake County, Montana, United States. The population was 275 at the 2010 census. It is located on Montana Highway 35 on the east bank of Flathead Lake, 22 miles from Polson.

Demographics

References

Census-designated places in Lake County, Montana
Census-designated places in Montana